Huth is a surname. People with this surname include:



A 
 Alfred Henry Huth (1850–1910), English author and bibliophile (son of Henry Huth)
 Angela Huth (1938–), English novelist and journalist
 Arno Huth, Encyclopedic international radio investigator of Switzerland
 August Ferdinand Louis Huth (1813–1892), German-born American entrepreneur, merchant, and public official

C 
 Christian Huth, (1964–), German graphic novelist who writes under the pen name of CX Huth

D 
 Dennis A. Huth Motorsports executive

E 
 Eilfried Huth (1930-), Austrian architect
 Ernst Huth (1845–1897), German botanist and naturalist
 Eugene Joseph Huth, The Marlboro Man

F 
 Franz Huth (1876–1970), German artist and professor
 Frederick Henry Huth, author of Works on Horses and Equitation: A bibliographical record of hippology London: B. Quaritch 1887

G 
 Geof Huth (1960–), American poet, artist, and archivist
 Georg Huth (1867–), German Orientalist and explorer
 Gerald Huth (1949–), American artist
 Gerry Huth (1933–), American football player

H 
 Hanno Huth (1953–), German film producer
 Hans Huth (1892–1977), German-born American author and curator
 Harold Huth (1892–1967), British actor, director and producer 
 Henry Huth (1815–1878), English bibliophile

J 
 James Huth, French film director, producer and writer
 Jannik Huth (1994–), German association football (soccer) player
 Joachim-Friedrich Huth (1896–1962), German lieutenant-general in the Luftwaffe
 Jochen Huth, German screenwriter
 John E. Huth, American physicist
 (John) Frederick Andrew Huth (formerly (Johann) Friedrich Andreas Huth) (1777–1864), British merchant and merchant banker

L 
 Louis Huth (1821–1905), British art collector, art dealer and patron of Aesthetic movement

M 
 Michael Huth, (1969–), German skater
 Michael Huth (computer scientist), German computer scientist and author

R 
 Radan Huth (1964–), Czech climatologist
 Robert Huth (1984–), German association football (soccer) player
 Ronald Huth (1989–), Paraguayan association football (soccer) player
 Rose Claire Huth (1915–1997), American scriptwriter

S 
 Svenja Huth, German footballer

T 
 Thomas J. Huth Emmy winning audio mixer
 Todd Huth (1963–), American guitarist

U 
 Ursula Huth (1952–), German stained glass-maker and painter

W 
 Walde Huth (1923–), German photographer
 Wilhelm Robert Huth (1890–1977), German abstract expressionist painter

References

See also 
 

Surnames

de:Huth
ja:フート
pt:Huth
ru:Хут